Vysokogorsk (lit. high mountain) is a rural locality (a selo) in Kavalerovsky District of Primorsky Krai, Russia, located in the Sikhote-Alin Mountains,  northeast of the district's administrative center of Kavalerovo. Population:

History
Vysokogorsk was granted urban-type settlement status in 1956 and demoted in status to that of a rural locality in December 2011.

Economy
Tin mining is the main means of employment of the local population.

Transportation
Vysokogorsk is connected with Kavalerovo and Dalnegorsk by an auto route.

References

Rural localities in Primorsky Krai